The Bai people is an ethnic group speaking the Bai language in South Sudan. The Bai language is a Niger–Congo language. Several thousand persons belong to this group. The Bai people mostly inhabit the Southern Sudanese state of Western Bahr el Ghazal.

References

Ethnic groups in South Sudan